Briceland is an unincorporated community in Humboldt County, California.

A post office operated at Briceland from 1889 to 1968. The name honors John C. Briceland, who purchased the site in 1889.

See also

References

Unincorporated communities in Humboldt County, California
Populated places established in 1889
California wine
Unincorporated communities in California